Ongpangkong is the largest mountain range in Mokokchung District in the Indian state of Nagaland. The district headquarters of Mokokchung is itself located in this range. Important villages are Longsa, Ungma, Chungtia, Longkhüm, Mokokchung Village, Khensa, Aliba, Mangmetong Mekuli, Kinunger, Chuchuyimpang. 

Geography of Nagaland